Meri Teri Uski Baat is a novel written by Yashpal. This novel is based on the history of Indian independence movement. This novel won the Hindi-language Sahitya Akademi Award in 1976.

References

1974 novels
20th-century Indian novels
Books about politics of India
Hindi-language novels
Rajkamal Prakashan books
Sahitya Akademi Award-winning works
1974 Indian novels